Saturn in Opposition is a 2007 Italian-Turkish drama film directed by  Ferzan Özpetek. The Turkish title is Bir ömür yetmez. It had its United States premiere at Frameline in San Francisco on 20 June 2008.

Plot
A group of very close friends live in Rome and cope with the sudden death of one of their members. The original group, who have been together for many years, are two straight couples, Antonio and Angelica, and Roberto and Neval; and a gay couple now separated, Sergio and Davide, a successful author. Relatively new additions to the group are Davide's current lover Lorenzo and Lorenzo's friend Roberta. Early in the movie a final member is added to the group: Paolo, an aspiring writer who is an acquaintance of Lorenzo and Roberta.

Although the members of the group love each other and spend much time together, there are tensions both within the group and within the three couples who make up the group. Antonio and Angelica seem to be a perfect couple, but their two young children are dysfunctional, and Antonio has been having a secret affair with Laura, a married woman with teenage children. Roberto feels like an outsider, because while Neval is a core member of the group he is not. And although Davide and Lorenzo look like the epitome of a beautiful, affluent gay couple, Paolo's entry into the group stirs up hidden currents of competition and infidelity that begin to test the relationship.

During a dinner party in Davide's apartment, Lorenzo without warning suffers an aneurysm and falls into a coma from which he does not recover. His friends are deeply shaken by his death; problems that have until then been hidden begin to emerge and threaten to destroy the group; and Davide almost commits suicide. They all finally convene at Davide's retreat in the mountains overlooking the sea and come to terms with one another and Lorenzo's death.

Cast 
 Stefano Accorsi as Antonio
 Margherita Buy as Angelica
 Serra Yilmaz as Neval
 Filippo Timi as Roberto
 Pierfrancesco Favino as Davide
 Ennio Fantastichini as Sergio
 Luca Argentero as Lorenzo
 Ambra Angiolini as Roberta
  as Paolo
 Isabella Ferrari as Laura, a florist, Antonio's secret mistress
 Milena Vukotic as Marta, head nurse in the hospital where Lorenzo dies

Awards
David di Donatello: Best Supporting Actress (Ambra Angiolini)
Nastro d'Argento: Best Script (Ferzan Özpetek), Best Supporting Actress (Ambra Angiolini), Best Actress (Margherita Buy), Best Song (Neffa)

External links 
 

2007 films
2007 comedy-drama films
2000s Italian-language films
Italian LGBT-related films
Films set in Italy
Films directed by Ferzan Özpetek
Italian comedy-drama films
LGBT-related comedy-drama films
2007 LGBT-related films
Turkish comedy-drama films